Deutsch is a surname, meaning German in German. When transliterated to other languages, it may also be spelled as Deutch, Deitch, Deich, Teutsch.


Deutsch
 Adam Deutsch,
 Adolph Deutsch, Academy Award-winning composer
 Alex Deutsch, founder of Deutsch Group
 Alexander Deutsch, German planetologist (active since 1984)
 Alexander Nikolaevich Deutsch, Russian astronomer (active 1926–1985)
 Alina Deutsch, Romanian-American electronics engineer
 Alvin Deutsch,
 Ana Deutsch (born 1940), psychologist and co-founder of the Program for Torture Victims
 André Deutsch, publisher in London
 Andrew Deutsch (born 1968), sound artist
 Armand Deutsch,
 Armelle Deutsch,
 Armin Joseph Deutsch (1918–1969), American astronomer and science fiction author
 Arnold Deutsch, NKVD operative who recruited Kim Philby
 Avraham Deutsch,
 Babette Deutsch (1895–1982), American author
 Barbu Nemțeanu (1887–1919), born Benjamin Deutsch, Romanian poet
 Beatie Deutsch (nee Rabin; born 1989), Haredi Jewish American-Israeli marathon runner
 Bence Deutsch,
 Boris Deutsch,
 Caroline Deutsch (b. 1846), German novelist
 Celia Deutsch,
 Chaim Deutsch, American politician
 Charles Deutsch, French engineer
 Charlie Deutsch,
 David Deutsch (born 1953), physicist
 David Deutsch (ad executive) (c. 1929 – 2013), American advertising executive
 Donny Deutsch,
 Diana Deutsch, British-born, American perceptual and cognitive psychologist
 Eliot Deutsch,
 Erik Deutsch,
 Ernst Deutsch (1890–1969), German actor
 Filip Deutsch (1828–1919), Croatian nobleman and industrialist
 Francine Deutsch,
 Fred Deutsch,
 George Deutsch, ex-NASA press officer
 Gerhard Deutsch,
 Gerti Deutsch,
 Gotthard Deutsch (1859–1921), scholar of Jewish history
 Gustav Deutsch,
 Hans Deutsch,
 Harold C. Deutsch (1904-1995), American historian and writer
 Harri Deutsch, (–2000), German publisher
 Helen Deutsch,
 Helene Deutsch, Austrian-born American psychologist
 Helmut Deutsch (born 1945), Austrian classical pianist
 Herbert Deutsch (born 1932), American composer
 Hubert Deutsch,
 Immanuel Oscar Menahem Deutsch (1829–1873), German oriental scholar
 Jan Deutsch,
 Joel Deutsch,
 John James Deutsch, Canadian economist
 Josef Deutsch,
 Josh Deutsch,
 Julio Deutsch (1859–1922), Croatian architect
 Julius Deutsch (1884–1968), Austrian politician
 Karl Deutsch (1912–1992), Czech social and political scientist
 Kevin Deutsch,
 Kurt Deutsch,
 Ladislas Deutsch, pen name of László Detre (1874–1939), Hungarian microbiologist
 Lea Deutsch (1927–1943), Croatian Jewish child actress who was murdered during the Holocaust
 Leo Deutsch (1855–1941) (known as Lev Deich in Russia), Russian revolutionary
 Linda Deutsch,
 Lindsay Deutsch,
 Lorànt Deutsch,
 Louis "Red" Deutsch (1890–1983), American boxer and owner of the "Tube Bar" in Jersey City
 L. Peter Deutsch, programmer and creator of the Ghostscript software
 Maria Deutsch,
 Mark Deutsch (musician), musician, inventor of bazantar
 Mark Deutsch (journalist) (Russian: Марк Дейч, also Deutch, Deich, Deitch, 1945–2012), Russian journalist
 Martin Deutsch, physicist, discoverer of positronium
 Martin Deutsch (psychologist) (1926–2002), American developmental psychologist
 Maury Deutsch,
 Max Deutsch, French-Austrian composer and director
 Mel Deutsch,
 Morton Deutsch (1920–2017), social psychologist and researcher in conflict resolution
 Naomi Deutsch,
 Nathaniel Deutsch,
 Niklaus Manuel Deutsch I (c. 1484–1530), Swiss artist
 Oscar Deutsch (1893–1941), founder of the British Odeon cinema chain
 Oskar Deutsch (born 1963), Austrian entrepreneur and President of the Jewish Community of Vienna 
 Otto Erich Deutsch (1883–1967), Austrian musicologist and creator of the Deutsch catalogue of Schubert's compositions
 Patti Deutsch (born 1945), 1970s game-show celebrity
 Peter Deutsch (born 1957), American politician
 Péter Deutsch (born 1968), Hungarian athlete
 Richard Deutsch,
 Robert Deutsch,
 Samuel Deutsch,
 Sándor Hatvany-Deutsch (1852–1913), Hungarian industrialist and art patron
 Sarah Deutsch,
 Seymon Deutsch (1935–2013), American bridge player
 Simion Deutsch,
 Simon Deutsch (1808–1877), Austrian Jewish writer and revolutionary
 Stephen Deutsch,
 Tamás Deutsch,
 Tamás Deutsch (politician),
 Verlag Harri Deutsch,
 Walter Deutsch,
 Yaron Deutsch,

Other spellings
 Fran Deitsch (1927–2011, married name Fran Landesman), American lyricist and poet
 Gene Deitch
 Kim Deitch
 Howard Deutch, film director
 John M. Deutch
 Madelyn Deutch, writer, director, actress and musician
 Zoey Deutch, actress and producer
 Georg Daniel Teutsch
 János Mattis-Teutsch

See also
Surnames meaning "German" of different origins:

 Douch (English)
 German (surname)
 Němec (Czech)
 Németh (Hungarian)
 Tedesco (surname) (Italian)

German-language surnames
Jewish surnames
Ethnonymic surnames